Testosterone propionate/testosterone ketolaurate (TP/TKL), sold under the brand name Testosid-Depot, is an injectable combination medication of testosterone propionate (TP), an androgen/anabolic steroid, and testosterone ketolaurate (TKL; testosterone caprinoylacetate), an androgen/anabolic steroid. It contains 25 mg TP and 150 to 300 mg TKL in oil solution and is administered by intramuscular injection at regular intervals. The medication has been reported to have a duration of action of about 14 to 20 days.

See also
 List of combined sex-hormonal preparations § Androgens

References

Abandoned drugs
Combined androgen formulations